Romeo (Hangul: 로미오; Japanese: ロメオ), mostly stylized as ROMEO, is a South Korean boy band formed by Pony Canyon Korea and CT Entertainment in 2015. The group is composed of seven members: Seunghwan, Yunsung, Milo, Minsung, Kyle, Hyunkyung and Kangmin. They debuted with the release of their first mini-album The Romeo on May 7, 2015.

History

2015: Debut with The Romeo and comeback with Zero In
At the end of April 2015, it was announced that Japanese company Pony Canyon made a partnership with South Korean agency CT Entertainment to debut a boygroup named Romeo, planning their debut in May. A representative from CT Entertainment told the media, "There have been cases where Japanese music labels will sign on popular Korean acts, but it's unlikely for a Japanese music label to want to start a Korean group. This project is happening thanks to the great trust between Pony Canyon and CT Entertainment." Following this announcement, their agency released a batch of teasers featuring the members, starting with Hyunkyung and ending with Yunsung and Minsung, and finally a full group teaser on April 27. Their agency released another teaser on April 30, this time featuring member Yunsung covering Michael Jackson's Man in the Mirror before releasing the group's first teaser for their debut song "Lovesick" on May 2. The full music video for "Lovesick" was released on May 7, alongside their debut EP The Romeo. The group made its debut on stage on M! Countdown the same day.

On October 28, it was announced that Romeo was going to make a comeback on November 5 with their second mini-album Zero In. On October 30, the group released their first teaser for title song "Target" followed on November 1 by a second teaser. On November 3, they released a medley of the songs from Zero In and on November 4 they released the full music video for "Target".

2016: Romeo Project, Miro and First Love
On May 17, CT Entertainment revealed that Romeo was going to release a summer digital single named "Nightmare" on May 23. The group released teasers featuring the seven members before releasing a video teaser on May 20. The full music video for "Nightmare" was released on May 23 alongside the eponym digital single.

On June 17, the group debuted the broadcasting of their first reality TV show named "Romeo Project in Taiwan" on MBC Music.

On June 19, Romeo was announced to release a new EP on June 23, thus releasing teasers featuring different units. The group then released two teasers, with an "Alice in Wonderland" concept, featuring SHINee's Minho, for their new song "Miro" from the eponym EP. It was revealed that Minho took part in filming the group's comeback MV thanks to CT Entertainment's CEO who used to be SHINee's former manager. The full music video for "Miro" was released on June 23 along with the eponym EP, which was released in three different unit versions. A full group version of their new EP was released on July 5. The group revealed that their choreography for "Miro" was inspired from the film The Maze Runner.

On August 17, CT Entertainment announced that Romeo was going to release a special edition of "Miro" as "First Love" on August 22, featuring the title track "Treasure". Furthermore, they also released some teasers with the members.

2017: MIX NINE 
On October 29, they Milo, Yunsung, Kyle, and Hyunkyung joined South Korean survival program MIX NINE.

Members
 Seunghwan — leader
 Yunsung
 Milo
 Minsung
 Kyle
 Hyunkyung
 Kangmin

Discography

Extended plays

Singles

Filmography

Reality/Variety shows

Videography

Music videos

Awards and nominations

Gaon Chart K-Pop Awards

|-
| 2016
| Romeo
| New Artist of the Year
|

Seoul Music Awards

|-
| rowspan="4"|2016
| rowspan="4"|Romeo
| Bonsang Award
| 
|-
| New Artist Award
| 
|-
| Popularity Award
| 
|-
| Hallyu Special Award
|

Korean Entertainment Art Awards

|-
| 2016
| Romeo
| Rookie of the Year
|

Notes

References

External links
Official fancafé

South Korean pop music groups
South Korean boy bands
Musical groups established in 2015
2015 establishments in South Korea
K-pop music groups
Peak Time contestants